Walter Capango Figueira (born 17 March 1995) is an English professional footballer who plays as a forward for Carshalton Athletic.

Club career
After impressing as a junior at Hampton & Richmond Borough, Walter joined Chelsea in 2010. He played 22 games (scoring five goals) for the Under 18s and Under 21s before injury curtailed his stay at Stamford Bridge. Having been released, he played one game at Hayes & Yeading United in the Conference South before moving to Greece.
He joined Platanias who play in the top division in Greece, and made eleven appearances for them last season. Figueira made his professional debut as a substitute in the 88th minute in the 1–0 loss to Asteras Tripolis in the Superleague Greece. He also played on loan at Acharnaikos who play in the league below the top division.

After spells with Bognor Regis Town and Chessington & Hook United, Figueira joined Wingate & Finchley in February 2017.

Following his spell with Wingate & Finchley, Figueira opted to join Portuguese side Moura.

On 4 August 2018, Figueira signed for National League South side Dulwich Hamlet.

On 19 September 2018, Figueira agreed to join Isthmian League side, Merstham on a three-month loan. The deal was then made permanent on 19 December 2018.

On 29 July 2019, Figueira joined League of Ireland Premier Division side Waterford on a deal until the end of the season.

On 28 January 2021 Figueira signed for Sligo Rovers.

On 2 February 2022, Figueira signed for Isthmian League Premier Division side Kingstonian.

Figueira joined Carshalton Athletic for the 2022-23 season.

Career statistics

References

1995 births
Living people
Association football forwards
English footballers
Chelsea F.C. players
Hayes & Yeading United F.C. players
Platanias F.C. players
Acharnaikos F.C. players
Bognor Regis Town F.C. players
Chessington & Hook United F.C. players
Wingate & Finchley F.C. players
Dulwich Hamlet F.C. players
Merstham F.C. players
Waterford F.C. players
Derry City F.C. players
Sligo Rovers F.C. players
Kingstonian F.C. players
Carshalton Athletic F.C. players
Footballers from Battersea
National League (English football) players
Isthmian League players
Super League Greece players
Football League (Greece) players
League of Ireland players
Expatriate footballers in Greece
Expatriate footballers in Portugal
Expatriate association footballers in the Republic of Ireland